The Dawson Highway is a state highway in Queensland, Australia. From Gladstone to Rolleston it is signed as State Route 60, and then A7 onwards to Springsure. It continues west for another  as Dawson Developmental Road to Tambo on the Landsborough Highway. North of Springsure, A7 becomes the Gregory Highway.

Many of the towns along the Dawson Highway are coal-mining establishments.

List of towns along the Dawson Highway
 Gladstone (Gladstone Region)
Gladstone Central
 West Gladstone
 New Auckland
 Clinton
 Calliope
 Biloela (Shire of Banana)
 Banana
 Moura
Bauhinia (Central Highlands Region)
 Rolleston
 Springsure

Major intersections

Upgrades

Replace bridges
The existing timber bridges on the Dawson Highway were subject to regular closures due to flooding. The $40 million replacement of 5 timber bridges project was completed in April 2018. The timber bridges were replaced with concrete structures to increase freight efficiency and flood immunity along the Dawson Highway. The new bridges were constructed at; Nine Mile Creek, Catfish Creek, Sheep Station Creek, Maxwelton Creek and Doubtful Creek.

Replace bridge near Tambo
A project to replace a timber bridge over the Barcoo River immediately north of Tambo, at a cost of $7 million, was expected to complete in mid-2022.

Replace Roundstone Creek bridge
A project to replace the Roundstone Creek bridge, at a cost of $12 million, was expected to complete in early 2022.

Strengthen bridges and improve pavement
A project to strengthen 5 bridges and to widen and rehabilitate  of paving, at a cost of $14.2 million, was expected to complete in June 2022 (the pavement component was completed in January 2021)

Design cycle facilities
A project to design cycle facilities for Glenlyon Street to Harvey Road in Gladstone, at a cost of $2.05 million, was to complete in December 2021.

Roads of Strategic Importance Upgrades
The Roads of Strategic Importance initiative, last updated in March 2022, includes the following projects for the Dawson Highway.

Corridor upgrade
A lead project to upgrade the Townsville to Roma corridor, including sections of the Gregory, Carnarvon and Dawson Highways and surrounding state and council roads, at an estimated cost of $125 million, commenced construction of some work projects in 2020. Planning continues for other projects.

Pavement strengthening and widening
A project to strengthen and widen sections of pavement between Banana and Rolleston at a cost of $6 million was completed in December 2020. This project was targeted for "early works" by the Queensland Government.

Roundstone Creek bridge overflow upgrade
A project to upgrade the Roundstone Creek bridge overflow at a cost of $6 million is due for completion in mid-2022. This project is targeted for "early works" by the Queensland Government.

Biloela heavy vehicle bypass
A project to construct a heavy vehicle bypass of Biloela for the Dawson Highway at a cost of $2.7 million is due for completion in late 2022.

Progressive sealing and new bridge
A project to upgrade and seal sections of the Dawson Developmental Road, and to build a new bridge over the Barcoo River, at a cost of $57 million is expected to finish in mid-2023. This project was targeted for "early works" by the Queensland Government, and has been split into two packages.

Proposals
This would involve significant upgrades to the Dawson Highway between Springsure and Rolleston.

See also

 Highways in Australia
 List of highways in Queensland

References

Highways in Queensland
Gladstone Region
Shire of Banana
Central Highlands Region
Buildings and structures in Central Queensland